Suket is a census town, near city of Kota in Kota district in the Indian state of Rajasthan. It is well known for mining of natural limestone named kota stone (Yellow & green limestone) and some of the renowned firms like ASI & Gafoor & sons are recognized for both. Suket lies on the bank of the AHU river, a tributary of the river Chambal.

Geography
It has an average elevation of 320 metres (1049 feet).

Demographics
 India census, Suket had a population of 16,983. Males constitute 49% of the population and females 51%. Suket has an average literacy rate of 98%, higher than the national average of 59.5%: male literacy is 70%, and female literacy is 50%. In Suket, 19% of the population is under 6 years of age.

References

Cities and towns in Kota district